The men's 400 metre freestyle event for the 1976 Summer Olympics was held in Montreal. The event took place on Tuesday, 22 July.

Heats
Heat 1

Heat 2

Heat 3

Heat 4

Heat 5

Heat 6

Heat 7

Final

References

External links
Official Olympic Report

Swimming at the 1976 Summer Olympics
Men's events at the 1976 Summer Olympics